Icó  is a town in Ceará, Brazil, located in the Microrregião of Salgado in the central part of the state. Icó borders the municipalities of Umari, Cedro, Iguatu, Orós, Jaguaribe, Pereiro, and the states of Rio Grande do Norte and Paraíba.

Icó sits on a flat plain on the right bank of the Salgado River, a short distance from its confluence with the Jaguaribe.

History

The greater area of central Ceará was explored in the 17th century with the town being founded in 1738. Icó reached its greatest point of  development in the 18th century as a commercial center connecting the hinterlands of the sertão and the coast. Its development declined due to successive droughts and a domestic cattle market centered on the south and southeastern provinces of Brazil. This process was accentuated by the construction of the Baturité Railroad in 1870, which left Icó on the fringe of regional trade.

In the mid-19th century the "Teatro da Ribeira dos Icós" was built. The town also has a historic church.

References

Municipalities in Ceará
Populated places established in 1738
1738 establishments in the Portuguese Empire